Elections to Coleraine Borough Council were held on 5 May 2011 on the same day as the other Northern Irish local government elections. The election used four district electoral areas to elect a total of 22 councillors.

Election results

Note: "Votes" are the first preference votes.

Districts summary

|- class="unsortable" align="centre"
!rowspan=2 align="left"|Ward
! % 
!Cllrs
! % 
!Cllrs
! %
!Cllrs
! %
!Cllrs
! % 
!Cllrs
! % 
!Cllrs
!rowspan=2|TotalCllrs
|- class="unsortable" align="center"
!colspan=2 bgcolor="" | DUP
!colspan=2 bgcolor="" | UUP
!colspan=2 bgcolor="" | SDLP
!colspan=2 bgcolor="" | Alliance
!colspan=2 bgcolor="" | Sinn Féin
!colspan=2 bgcolor="white"| Others
|-
|align="left"|Bann
|bgcolor="#D46A4C"|35.0
|bgcolor="#D46A4C"|2
|25.5
|2
|15.3
|1
|4.1
|0
|16.5
|1
|3.6
|0
|6
|-
|align="left"|Coleraine Central
|bgcolor="#D46A4C"|31.9
|bgcolor="#D46A4C"|3
|16.0
|1
|8.6
|1
|7.2
|0
|8.3
|0
|28.0
|1
|6
|-
|align="left"|Coleraine East
|bgcolor="#D46A4C"|59.9
|bgcolor="#D46A4C"|3
|23.1
|1
|6.8
|0
|10.2
|1
|0.0
|0
|0.0
|0
|5
|-
|align="left"|The Skerries
|20.8
|1
|17.1
|1
|8.6
|1
|16.0
|1
|6.9
|0
|bgcolor="#DDDDDD"|30.6
|bgcolor="#DDDDDD"|1
|5
|-'
|-
|- class="unsortable" class="sortbottom" style="background:#C9C9C9"
|align="left"| Total
|35.6
|9
|20.6
|5
|10.5
|3
|8.8
|2
|9.0
|1
|15.5
|2
|22
|-
|}

District results

Bann

2005: 2 x DUP, 2 x UUP, 1 x Sinn Féin, 1 x SDLP
2011: 2 x DUP, 2 x UUP, 1 x Sinn Féin, 1 x SDLP
2005-2011 Change: No change

Coleraine Central

2005: 3 x UUP, 2 x DUP, 1 x SDLP
2011: 3 x DUP, 1 x UUP, 1 x SDLP, 1 x Independent
2005-2011 Change: DUP gain from UUP, Independent leaves UUP

Coleraine East

2005: 3 x DUP, 2 x UUP
2011: 3 x DUP, 1 x UUP, 1 x Alliance
2005-2011 Change: Alliance gain from UUP

The Skerries

2005: 2 x DUP, 1 x UUP, 1 x SDLP, 1 x Independent
2011: 1 x DUP, 1 x UUP, 1 x Alliance, 1 x SDLP, 1 x Independent
2005-2011 Change: Alliance gain from DUP

References

Coleraine Borough Council elections
Coleraine